Jalmenus icilius, the Icilius blue or amethyst hairstreak, is a butterfly of the family Lycaenidae. It is found in all mainland states of Australia, throughout much of the subtropical areas of the inland, from the Selwyn Range and from Carnarvon to Kalgoorlie. It is generally common except in the south-eastern end of its range in central and western Victoria, where it is now very scarce.

The wingspan is about 30 mm.

The larvae feed on a wide range of plants, including Cassia artemisioides, Cassia nemophila, Daviesia benthamii, and the Acacia species: A. acuminata, A. anceps, A. aneura, A. dealbata, A. deanei, A. harpophylla, A. mearnsii, A. parramattensis, A. pendula, A. pycnantha, A. rubida, A. saligna and A. victoriae.

The caterpillars are attended by the ant species Iridomyrmex rufoniger.

External links
Australian Insects
Australian Faunal Directory

Theclinae
Taxa named by William Chapman Hewitson
Taxa described in 1865